David Savage may refer to:

David Savage (1830–1893), an English-born Canadian Methodist minister 
Dave Savage (born 1973), Irish footballer
David Savage, singer of the English 1990s synthpop duo Sexus, part of the Romo movement

See also
David McSavage (1965/1966), Irish comedy writer and comic
Dan Savage (1964), American journalist and activist